Daniela Cardoso (born 15 December 1991) is a Portuguese race walker. She competed in the women's 20 kilometres walk event at the 2016 Summer Olympics.

References

External links
 

1991 births
Living people
Portuguese female racewalkers
Place of birth missing (living people)
Athletes (track and field) at the 2016 Summer Olympics
Olympic athletes of Portugal